Luis Antonio Ramírez Pineda (born 11 June 1970) is a Mexican politician. He served as Deputy of the LIX Legislature of the Mexican Congress as a plurinominal representative.

References

1970 births
Living people
Politicians from Oaxaca
Members of the Chamber of Deputies (Mexico)
People from Huajuapan de León
Instituto Tecnológico Autónomo de México alumni
Alumni of the London School of Economics
21st-century Mexican politicians
Institutional Revolutionary Party politicians
Deputies of the LIX Legislature of Mexico